Sanjeev Sharma  (born 25 August 1965) is a former Indian cricketer ,  entrepreneur & cricket coach who played in two Test matches and 23 One Day Internationals from 1988 to 1997. As right arm medium pace bowler, he was one of several bowlers tried out as Kapil Dev's opening partners in the 80's. He made an impressive start by polishing off the tail on his Test debut against New Zealand in 1988–89 to finish with three for 37. He toured West Indies in 1989. After a career that spanned nearly 20 years, he announced his retirement from competitive cricket in November 2004.

His best batting figure against Uttar Pradesh is 117 not-out in the first innings and 55 not-out in the second innings at Karnail Singh Stadium, Delhi during Ranji Trophy in 1991. He was awarded the man of the match for this batting performance.

In August 2019, he was appointed the coach of Senior Arunachal Pradesh Cricket Team.

These days, he spends his time running a franchise of UClean in Delhi. UClean is India's largest laundry and dry-cleaning chain which works on the franchise model.

References

1965 births
Living people
India Test cricketers
India One Day International cricketers
Indian cricketers
Central Zone cricketers
Delhi cricketers
Railways cricketers
North Zone cricketers
Rajasthan cricketers
Indian cricket coaches
Coaches of the Singapore national cricket team